Yoav Segalovich (born 23 April 1959) is an Israeli law enforcement officer and politician. Previously head of Lahav 433 and the Investigations and Intelligence Division, he is currently a member of the Knesset for Yesh Atid.

Biography
Segalovich was born in 1959 to Nahum and Tahia. He grew up in Tel Aviv and served in the Paratroopers Brigade during his national service in the Israel Defense Forces. He subsequently studied law at Tel Aviv University and volunteered in the Civil Guard. He joined the Police and worked as a prosecutor in the Sharon region, before becoming head of the Investigations Department in Netanya.

He later became a trainer at the College for Senior Police Officers, before being appointed commander of the Eilat area police in September 2002. Eighteen months later he left to establish the national economic crime unit in the national police headquarters. In 2008 he became the first head of the Lahav 433 unit, which focused on national crime and corruption. The following year he became commander of the Investigations and Intelligence Division, a post he held until retiring in 2013.

In 2016 he joined the Yesh Atid party. After the party became part of the Blue and White alliance, he was given the twenty-eighth slot on the alliance's list for the April 2019 Knesset elections, and was subsequently elected to the Knesset as Blue and White won 35 seats. He was re-elected in September 2019 and March 2020.

Following the 2020 elections, Segalovich opposed Blue and White joining Benjamin Netanyahu's government. This led to a split in the alliance, with Yesh Atid and Telem breaking away to sit in opposition. During the Knesset term, Segalovich served as chair of the Lobby for the Fight Against Governmental Corruption and the Lobby to Combat Violence in Arab Society.

Segalovich is married to Dorit; the couple have three children.

References

External links

1959 births
Living people
Blue and White (political alliance) politicians
Deputy ministers of Israel
Israeli police chiefs
Jewish Israeli politicians
Members of the 21st Knesset (2019)
Members of the 22nd Knesset (2019–2020)
Members of the 23rd Knesset (2020–2021)
Members of the 24th Knesset (2021–2022)
Members of the 25th Knesset (2022–)
People from Tel Aviv
Tel Aviv University alumni
Yesh Atid politicians